Pnoepyga is a genus of passerines endemic to southern and southeastern Asia. Its members are known as cupwings or wren-babblers. The genus contains four species. The genus has long been placed in the babbler family Timaliidae. A 2009 study of the DNA of the families Timaliidae and the Old World warblers (Sylviidae) found no support for the placement of the genus in either family, prompting the authors to erect a new monogeneric family, the Pnoepygidae.

This genus of diminutive passerines has a mostly montane distribution in South and Southeast Asia. The scaly-breasted cupwing is found in the mountainous areas of north India eastwards to southern China and northern Vietnam. The Taiwan cupwing is endemic to Taiwan, and similarly the Nepal cupwing has a restricted distribution, mostly occurring in Nepal (and also slightly into India). The most widespread species is the pygmy cupwing, which occurs from China and India south through Southeast Asia into the Malay Peninsula and Indonesia as far as Flores and Timor.

Species
The genus contains the following four species:

References

 
Bird genera
Taxonomy articles created by Polbot